W32EV-D, virtual channel 18 (UHF digital channel 32), is a low-powered, Class A independent television station licensed to Adamsville, Tennessee, United States. The station is owned by the Unity Broadcasting Network. In 2011, the station began broadcasting in digital, and changed its call sign from the previous W18BL to W18BL-D on July 14, 2011. The station changed its callsign to W32EV-D on September 17, 2020.

Coverage areas
Adamsville, Tennessee
Crump, Tennessee
Savannah, Tennessee
Stantonville, Tennessee
Michie, Tennessee
Guys, Tennessee
Eastview, Tennessee
Ramer, Tennessee
Selmer, Tennessee
Bethel Springs, Tennessee
Finger, Tennessee
Enville, Tennessee
Milledgeville, Tennessee
Sardis, Tennessee
Saltillo, Tennessee
Waynesboro, Tennessee

References

External links
Unity Broadcasting Website- http://www.ubntv.org
Broadcast Coverage Map- https://maps.google.com/?q=http://www.fcc.gov/fcc-bin/contourplot.kml?gmap=2%26appid=1425530%26call=W32EV-D%26freq=0.0%26contour=51%26city=ADAMSVILLE%26state=TN

 

Television stations in Tennessee
Television channels and stations established in 1994
Low-power television stations in the United States